Terry Allen may refer to:

Music
 Terry Allen (artist) (born 1943), American country singer and artist
 Terry Allen (big band singer) (1916–1981), American big band singer

Sports
Terry Allen (American football coach) (born 1957), American football coach at Missouri State University
Terry Allen (basketball) (born 1993), American professional basketball player
Terry Allen (boxer) (1924–1987), English flyweight boxer
Terry Allen (running back) (born 1968), American former running back for the Washington Redskins
Magnum T. A. (born 1959), professional wrestler born Terry Allen

Others
 Terry (Terril) Diener Allen who wrote as T. D. Allen with her husband Don Bala Allen
Terry de la Mesa Allen Sr. (1888–1969), US Army general in World War II

See also
Allen (surname)